Ástandið (Icelandic: "the condition" or "the situation") is a term used in Iceland to refer to the influence Allied troops had on Icelandic women during the Second World War. At its peak the number of Allied soldiers was equal to that of Icelandic men. Many of the foreign soldiers would court Icelandic women and estimates of the number of local women who married foreign soldiers goes into the hundreds. Such interaction between Icelandic women and foreign troops was not always well received and the women involved were often accused of prostitution and betraying their home country. Children born from such unions are known in Icelandic as ástandsbörn ("children of the condition/situation").

When the British military invaded Iceland in 1940, people gathered on the streets to see the troops and the fact that many Icelandic women were captivated by them did not go unnoticed. Immediately discussions began over what effect this would have and minimal interaction with Allied troops was encouraged, but this proved to be difficult as many Icelanders had jobs which in some way led them to interact with the troops. A committee was formed at the behest of the Icelandic government, which published a report noting the prevalence of engaging with prostitutes among the troops. The Icelandic government tried unsuccessfully to reduce the Allied soldiers' encounters with Icelandic women but with time the issue lapsed, as all Allied forces evacuated the island upon the conclusion of the war in 1945.

American troops returned to Iceland in 1951 as part of the Iceland Defense Force during the Cold War. In order to reassure the Icelandic government, all American troops were now restricted to the Keflavík Air Base, which remained operational until 2006，when the US briefly left only to return in 2016.

See also 
 Iceland in World War II
 British occupation of the Faroe Islands
 Battle of the Atlantic

References

20th century in Iceland
Iceland in World War II
Sexuality in Iceland
Women in Iceland
Euphemisms
Iceland–United Kingdom relations
Iceland–United States relations
1940 establishments in Europe
1945 disestablishments in Europe